The 1998 Arab Cup Final was a football match that took place on 1 October 1998, at the Khalifa International Stadium in Doha, Qatar, to determine the winner of the 1998 Arab Cup.
Saudi Arabia defeated Qatar 3–1 to win their first Arab Cup.

Road to the final

Match

Details

References

External links
1998 Arab Cup - rsssf.com

F
1998
Nations
Nations
International association football competitions hosted by Qatar
Saudi Arabia national football team matches
Qatar national football team matches
October 1998 sports events in Asia
20th century in Doha